Brian Patrick Stepanek (born February 6, 1971) is an American actor. He is known for his role as Arwin Hawkhauser on the Disney Channel original series The Suite Life of Zack & Cody and Brian on Brian O'Brian. He was also a Sector Seven Agent in the 2007 Michael Bay film Transformers, and also had a supporting role in The Island. Stepanek is also known as the voice of Roger in Father of the Pride and played Tom Harper on the Nickelodeon series Nicky, Ricky, Dicky & Dawn from 2014 to 2018. Since 2016, he has voiced Lynn Loud Sr. on the Nickelodeon animated series The Loud House, and has since portrayed the character in the 2022 live-action spinoff series The Really Loud House.

Career
Stepanek is known for his role as Arwin in the Disney Channel sitcom The Suite Life of Zack & Cody. He appeared in the 2005 film The Island.

Stepanek has done additional voiceovers in the movies Lemony Snicket's A Series of Unfortunate Events, Kim Possible, Charlotte's Web and Over the Hedge. He voiced Roger in Father of the Pride. He appeared in the sitcoms What I Like About You and Malcolm in the Middle. He was a co-host for the first Disney Channel Games. Stepanek portrayed the popular Batman villain, The Riddler on one of the Batman OnStar commercials. Stepanek can also be seen as the bank manager in the Disney direct-to-DVD movie Beverly Hills Chihuahua 2.

In 2008, he voiced Martin in the movie Bolt. He was an uncredited policeman in Friday After Next. He has his first voice role in The Secret Saturdays as Agent Epsilon. Brian voices Kick, Brad and Brianna's father, Harold Buttowski on the Disney XD animated series Kick Buttowski.

Stepanek starred in a series of shorts that aired on Disney Channel called Brian O'Brian, which was a silent slapstick-style series and which was filmed in Milan, Italy. He starred in the Disney Channel Original Movie Hatching Pete as the Coach Mackay, and Mostly Ghostly as Phears. He reprised his role as Arwin for three episodes of The Suite Life on Deck. He made an appearance in season 9, episode 19 of Two and a Half Men. Stepanek starred in Mr. Young as Adam's university professor, Dr. Fenway.

From 2014 to 2018, Stepanek portrayed Tom Harper in the Nickelodeon television series Nicky, Ricky, Dicky & Dawn, the father of the title quadruplets. In 2015, he appeared in the animated film Home voicing several roles, including the Gorg Commander.

In 2016, he began voicing family patriarch Lynn Loud Sr. on the Nicktoon The Loud House and reprised the role in its spinoff The Casagrandes as a guest star and the feature film The Loud House Movie. He also physically portrays Lynn Sr. in the live-action television film A Loud House Christmas and its follow-up series The Really Loud House.

Personal life
Stepanek was born and raised in Cleveland, Ohio; from 1985 to 1989, he attended Gilmour Academy, and went on to attend Syracuse University.  Since 2002, he has been married to Parisa Stepanek, and together, they have three children.

Filmography

Film

Television

References

External links

1971 births
Living people
20th-century American male actors
American male film actors
American male television actors
American male voice actors
American people of Czech descent
Male actors from Cleveland
21st-century American male actors
American male stage actors
Syracuse University alumni